Richard Steel (13 March 1930 - August 1991) was an English former professional footballer who played as a full-back in the Football League for Bristol City and York City, and in non-League football for Ferryhill Athletic, Merthyr Tydfil and Chippenham Town.

References

1930 births
1991 deaths
People from Sedgefield
Footballers from County Durham
English footballers
Association football fullbacks
Ferryhill Athletic F.C. players
Bristol City F.C. players
York City F.C. players
Merthyr Tydfil F.C. players
Chippenham Town F.C. players
English Football League players